Xavier Woods (born July 26, 1995) is an American football safety for the Carolina Panthers of the National Football League (NFL). He was selected by the Dallas Cowboys in the sixth round of the 2017 NFL Draft. He played college football at Louisiana Tech.

Early years
Woods attended West Monroe High School. As a freshman, he played at wide receiver. As a sophomore, he moved to defensive back and intercepted 6 passes, including 2 returned for touchdowns.

As a junior, he helped his team win the 2011 football state championship, while posting 43 tackles, 5 interceptions, 6 receptions for 233 yards and 2 punt returns for 60 yards. 

As a senior, he received All-state, All-Northeast Louisiana and All-district honors. He also practiced basketball.

College career
Woods accepted a football scholarship from Louisiana Tech University. He started 10 games out of 12 as a true freshman at free safety, tallying 61 tackles (3 for loss) and 2 passes defensed.

As a sophomore, he posted 71 tackles (3.5 for loss), 7 passes defensed and 3 forced fumbles. He also had 6 interceptions, including one returned for a touchdown in a win over the University of Illinois in the 2014 Heart of Dallas Bowl.

As a junior he took a step back, recording 56 tackles (7.5 for loss), 3 interceptions and 3 passes defensed. 

As a senior, he registered 89 tackles (6.5 for loss), 5 interceptions and 6 passes defensed. He graduated after starting all but two career games, collecting 181 tackles (20.5 for loss), 14 interceptions (third in school history), 18 passes defensed, 4 sacks, 6 forced fumbles, and 325 interception return yards (first in school history).

College statistics

Professional career
Woods was one of 60 defensive backs invited to the NFL Scouting Combine in Indianapolis, Indiana. He performed all of the combine positional drills, finishing seventh among safeties in the 40-yard dash. Woods also tied for second in the three-cone drill, tied for third among his position group in the bench press, and sixth in the broad jump. 

On March 23, 2017, he participated at Louisiana Tech's pro day, along with Carlos Henderson, Trent Taylor, and 12 other prospects. Woods beat his times at the combine in the 40-yard dash (4.51), 20-yard dash (2.59), and 10-yard dash (1.58) while also performing positional drills for scouts and team representatives from all 32 NFL teams. At the conclusion of the pre-draft process, Woods was projected by NFL draft experts and scouts to be selected anywhere from the fourth to sixth rounds. He was ranked as the seventh best strong safety in the draft by NFLDraftScout.com.

Dallas Cowboys
Woods was selected by the Dallas Cowboys in the sixth round (191st overall) of the 2017 NFL Draft. On May 11, he was signed to a four-year, $2.55 million contract that includes a signing bonus of $159,888.

Throughout training camp, Woods competed for a roster spot against Robert Blanton, Kavon Frazier, and Jameill Showers. Head coach Jason Garrett named him the backup free safety to Byron Jones to begin the regular season.

He made his professional regular season debut in the Dallas Cowboys' season-opening 19-3 victory over the New York Giants. On September 25, Woods recorded three solo tackles and deflected a pass in the Cowboys' 28-17 victory at the Arizona Cardinals. He recorded his first career tackle on the opening kickoff on Cardinals' running back Kerwynn Williams after a 21-yard kick return. On November 12, he collected four combined tackles, defended a pass, and made his first career interception off a deflected pass from Atlanta Falcons' quarterback Matt Ryan during a 27-7 loss. The following week, Woods earned his first career start at strong safety after Jeff Heath suffered a concussion the previous week against the Falcons. He recorded five combined tackles as the Cowboys were routed by the Philadelphia Eagles 37-9. In Week 11, Woods earned the starting strong safety job and recorded three combined tackles during a 38-14 win against the Washington Redskins. Because of injuries to other players he was moved between safety and slot cornerback during the season, and although he had some problems tackling, he finished with 41 tackles, one interception, 6 passes defensed, 4 quarterback pressures and one fumble recovery.

In 2018, Byron Jones was moved to right cornerback and Woods was named the regular starter at free safety in the organized team activities. He missed the first 2 contests of the season, with a hamstring injury he suffered in the preseason game against the Cincinnati Bengals and was replaced with Kavon Frazier. He registered 67 tackles (sixth on the defense), 2 interceptions (tied for the team lead), 9 passes defensed and one forced fumble. He had 5 tackles and one interception against the Houston Texans. He made 10 tackles against the Atlanta Falcons. He had had 7 tackles, 3 passes defensed and one interception on Thanksgiving Day against the Washington Redskins.

In 2019, he finished the season with 15 starts, 81 tackles (fifth on the team), one tackle for loss, 2 interceptions (tied for the team lead), 5 passes defensed and two forced fumbles and one fumble recovery. He had 12 tackles in the season opener against the New York Giants. He missed the third game against the Miami Dolphins with an ankle injury. In Week 9, he recorded an interception and a forced fumble in a 37-18 win over the New York Giants, earning him NFC Defensive Player of the Week honors.

In 2020, he was expected to take a leap in his contribution on the field, but he struggled along with the rest of the defense during the season. He also faced criticism in the media, after being quoted as saying: "I mean, on certain plays some guys, I mean, me included, there may be a lack, but overall the effort is there. I mean, you don't expect, we're in the NFL, you don't expect guys full speed for 70 plays. That's not possible. But you're going to push all you can. I mean, we know. You don't expect a backside corner to make a play on the opposite side. If he's running full speed the whole time, it's just not possible, to be honest", which Woods maintained that it was taken out of context and that it was not indicative of the team's commitment or effort. He missed the fifteenth game against the Philadelphia Eagles with a rib injury and was replaced with Darian Thompson. He collected 86 tackles (second on the team), 2 tackles for loss, one pass defensed and did not force any turnovers.

Minnesota Vikings
On March 30, 2021, Woods signed a one-year contract with the Minnesota Vikings.

Carolina Panthers
On March 16, 2022, Woods signed a three-year, $15.75 million contract with the Carolina Panthers.

References

External links
 Louisiana Tech Bulldogs bio

1995 births
Living people
People from West Monroe, Louisiana
Players of American football from Louisiana
American football safeties
Louisiana Tech Bulldogs football players
Dallas Cowboys players
Minnesota Vikings players
Carolina Panthers players